Võ Văn Hạnh (born 10 April 1974) is a retired Vietnamese footballer who used to play as a goalkeeper for V-League club Đà Nẵng F.C. which he spent 5 years. He also played twice for his country in 2002.

In addition to being a footballer Võ Văn Hạnh is also well known as an incredibly devout Buddhists who is a vegetarian and makes regular visits to the temple in accordance with his faith. During his playing career Võ Văn Hạnh was sometimes affectionately known as Nhà Sư or The Monk for his devotion to Buddhism. After retiring from football Võ Văn Hạnh has taken part in many Buddhist public activities as well as working to promote interfaith dialog.

References

1974 births
Living people
Vietnamese Buddhists
Vietnamese footballers
Vietnam international footballers
Song Lam Nghe An FC players
Hoang Anh Gia Lai FC players
SHB Da Nang FC players
V.League 1 players
Association football goalkeepers